Nicholas Nickleby is a British television series which first aired on the BBC in 1977. It is based on the novel Nicholas Nickleby by Charles Dickens.

Cast
 Nigel Havers as Nicholas Nickleby 
 Peter Bourke as Smike 
 Derek Godfrey as Ralph Nickleby 
 Robert James as Newman Noggs 
 Kate Nicholls as Kate Nickleby 
 Hilary Mason as Mrs. Nickleby 
 Malcolm Reid as Mr. Alfred Mantalini
 Derek Francis as Wackford Squeers 
 Patricia Routledge as Madame Mantalini 
 Patsy Smart as Miss La Creevy 
 Anthony Ainley as Sir Mulberry Hawk 
 Nigel Hughes as Lord Frederick Verisopht 
 Denis Gilmore as Wackford Jnr
 Raymond Mason as Charles Cheeryble 
 David Griffin as Frankie Cheeryble
 Preston Lockwood as Tim Linkinwater 
 Andrew McCulloch as John Browdie 
 John Hewer as Edwin Cherryble 
 Ron Pember as Mr. Snawley 
 Isabelle Amyes as Miss Fanny Squeers 
 Hetty Baynes as Matilda Price
 Patricia Brake as Madeline Bray 
 Edward Burnham as Mr. Lillyvick 
 Anne Ridler as Mrs. Squeers 
 Mark Teale as Belling 
 Pauline Moran as Miss Petowker 
 Dennis Edwards as Mr. Walter Bray 
 Freddie Jones as Mr. Vincent Crummles 
 Pauline Letts as Mrs. Crummles
 Paul Curran as Arthur Gride
 Liz Smith as Peg Sliderskew

References

Bibliography
 Michael Pointer. Charles Dickens on the Screen: The Film, Television, and Video Adaptations. Scarecrow Press, 1996.

External links
 

BBC television dramas
1977 British television series debuts
1977 British television series endings
1970s British drama television series
English-language television shows
Television series set in the 19th century
Television shows based on works by Charles Dickens